The Rustler 36 is a cruising yacht produced by Rustler Yachts of Falmouth. First produced in the early 1980s by Orion Marine, the yacht is of modern GRP construction, but retains the well ballasted long keel and strong construction of the traditional British sailing yacht. The high standard of construction and traditional highly seaworthy profile differentiate it from cheaper, more lightly built mass production yachts such as the Beneteau range.

The Rustler 36 is the yacht most participants have selected to use in the 2018 Golden Globe Race, with 6 of the 18 sailors sailing it. Only 5 out of 18 boats finished the race, the winner is Jean-Luc Van Den Heede on the Rustler 36 Matmut, the second and third boats are also Rustler 36.

See also
Rustler Yachts
Rustler 33
Rustler 37

References

External links
Rustler Yachts
Rustler 36

Sailing yachts
1980s sailboat type designs
Sailboat type designs by Holman & Pye